Flinders Naval Depot Soccer Club was an Australian military association football (soccer) club based at Crib Point, on the Mornington Peninsula of Victoria. Flinders played most of its known home matches at the HMAS Cerberus naval base, where it competed in the modern Football Victoria state league system sporadically after its founding in 1924, before competing regularly in 1950 till its folding in 1967.

The club is known for being the first military and Mornington Peninsula club to have been conference premiers and champions at the state's highest level in 1928, modernly recognized as the National Premier Leagues Victoria. Throughout its history, Flinders competed in the modern day first, second, third and fourth tier state leagues in its existence, and won the Dockerty Cup on three occasions.

Honours
Victorian State First Tier Finals
Champions (1): 1928
Victorian State First Tier
Premiers (1): 1928 (South)
Runner's Up (1): 1929
Victorian State Second Tier
Premiers (2): 1924 (Section A), 1941
Runner's Up (1): 1935
Victorian State Third Tier
Premiers (2): 1927 (Section B), 1934 
Runner's Up (2): 1950 (South), 1963 (South)
Dockerty Cup
Winners (3): 1924, 1926, 1928
Runner's Up (1): 1927

Source:

References

Soccer clubs in Melbourne
Association football clubs established in 1924
1924 establishments in Australia
Victorian Premier League teams
1967 disestablishments in Australia
Association football clubs disestablished in 1967
Defunct soccer clubs in Australia
Sport in the Shire of Mornington Peninsula